Liufang Station is a station on Line 13 of the Beijing Subway in China.

Station layout 
The station has 2 at-grade side platforms.

Exits 
There are 2 exits, lettered A and B. Exit A is accessible.

External links

Beijing Subway stations in Chaoyang District